Keith Richard Carter is an American football coach and former tight end who is the offensive line coach and run game coordinator for the New York Jets of the National Football League (NFL).

Playing career 
At Downingtown High School, Carter was a three-year starter as a tight end and defensive end. He was recruited to play tight end by Gary Bernardi at UCLA. After redshirting his first year, but he was awarded the Charles Pike Memorial Award for his help with the scout team. In 2002, he played in nine games starting three of them. He also took snaps that season as a blocking running back. In April 2003, Carter plowed into the back of a car on his motorcycle ending his playing career.

Coaching career

Early coaching career 
Carter began coaching at UCLA while he was still a student there in 2005. In 2006 he coached the tight ends for Wagner College. He then went to the University of Redlands where he coached the offensive line in 2007 and 2008. The next three seasons he coached at the University of San Diego working with the tight ends in 2009 and the  offensive line in 2010 and 2011.

Seattle Seahawks
Carter made the jump to the NFL in 2012 where he coached with the Seahawks during the 2012 and 2013 seasons including Seattle's Super Bowl XLVIII Championship.

Atlanta Falcons
After spending the 2014 season back at the collegiate level, serving as the Spartans run game coordinator and offensive line coach. Carter returned to the NFL this time with the Falcons. He spent 2015 and 2016 as Atlanta's assistant offensive line coach and 2017 as the team's running backs coach.

Tennessee Titans
In 2018 Carter became the offensive line coach for the Tennessee Titans.

On January 9, 2023, the Titans head coach Mike Vrabel announced Carter had been fired.

New York Jets
On January 24, 2023 the New York Jets announced that Carter was hired as the team’s offensive line coach and run game coordinator.

Personal life 
Keith and his wife, Kristin, have two daughters Kayla and Kamryn. He is the grandson of Pro Football Hall of Fame defensive lineman Gino Marchetti, who played with the Baltimore Colts.

References

1982 births
Living people
American football tight ends
Atlanta Falcons coaches
People from Downingtown, Pennsylvania
People from Phoenixville, Pennsylvania
Players of American football from Pennsylvania
San Diego Toreros football coaches
San Jose State Spartans football coaches
Seattle Seahawks coaches
Tennessee Titans coaches
UCLA Bruins football players
UCLA Bruins football coaches
Wagner Seahawks football coaches